Glendy Burke was the 29th mayor of New Orleans (June 8, 1865 – June 28, 1865).

Even before he became mayor he had had a paddle steamer named for him and the name of the boat was used by Stephen Foster in his song The Glendy Burk.

References 

Year of birth missing
Year of death missing
Mayors of New Orleans